Dudaş may refer to:
 Dudaş, Beypazarı, Ankara Province, Turkey
 Dudaş, Söğüt, Bilecik Province, Turkey